Demetrida aitape is a species of ground beetle in Lebiinae subfamily. It was described by Darlington in 1968 and is found in Indonesia and New Guinea.

Reference

Beetles described in 1968
 Beetles of Indonesia
Beetles of Papua New Guinea
aitape
Endemic fauna of New Guinea